Barking may refer to:

Places
 Barking, London, a town in East London, England
 London Borough of Barking and Dagenham, a local government district covering the town of Barking
 Municipal Borough of Barking, a historical local government district covering the town of Barking
 Barking (UK Parliament constituency), including Barking and Becontree
 Barking, Suffolk, a village and civil parish in the Mid Suffolk district of Suffolk, England
 Barking Lodge, a village in Jamaica
 Barking Sands, Hawaii, United States

Arts and media
 Barking (album), by Underworld
 "Barking" (song), by Ramz
 Barking (TV series), a 1998 British sketch comedy show
 Barking!, a 2004 British children's series

Other uses
 Bark (sound), the sound made primarily by domesticated dogs for communication
 Barking Rugby Football Club, an English rugby union club in Barking, London